Euchersadaula lathriopa is a moth of the family Oecophoridae. It was first described by Edward Meyrick in 1905. This species is endemic to New Zealand.

References

Oecophorinae
Moths of New Zealand
Moths described in 1905
Taxa named by Edward Meyrick
Endemic fauna of New Zealand
Endemic moths of New Zealand